Lumen Veritatis is a quarterly peer-reviewed academic journal published by the St. Thomas Aquinas Institute of Theology and the Aristotelian-Thomistic Institute of Philosophy in Brazil. Its covers the study of theology and philosophy in a Thomistic perspective in a critical dialogue with other philosophical schools.

External links 
 
 

Philosophy journals
Portuguese-language journals
Publications established in 2007
Thomism
Quarterly journals
Catholic studies journals